Pen y Castell is a summit in the Carneddau mountains in north Wales. It tops the east ridge of Drum (Wales). The summit consists of rocky outcrops amid a small boggy plateau. Views of the higher Carneddau ridge to the west, Craig Eigiau to the south, Tal y Fan to the north and the Conwy valley to the east can be seen.

References

Mountains and hills of Snowdonia
Nuttalls
Mountains and hills of Conwy County Borough
Caerhun